= Evick Knob =

Summit in West Virginia, United States

Coordinates: 38.5637°N 79.2170°W

Evick Knob is a summit in West Virginia, in the United States. With an elevation of 2,667 feet (813 m), Evick Knob is the 489th highest summit in the state of West Virginia.

Evick Knob has the name of Christian Evick, an early settler.
